Rüppell's vulture (Gyps rueppelli), also called Rüppell's griffon vulture, named after Eduard Rüppell, is a large bird of prey, mainly native to the Sahel region and East Africa. The current population of 22,000 is decreasing due to loss of habitat, incidental poisoning, and other factors. Known also as Rüppell's griffon, Rueppell's griffon, Rüppell's griffin vulture, Rueppell's vulture and other variants, it is not to be confused with a different species, the griffon vulture (Gyps fulvus).

Distribution 

Rüppell's vulture is distributed throughout the Sahel region and East Africa, where it inhabits grasslands, mountains, and woodlands. Once considered common in these habitats, it is experiencing steep declines, especially in the western portion of the range.

Description 

The Rüppell's vulture is a large vulture, noticeably outsizing the closely related white-backed vulture, with which they often occur in the wild. Both sexes look alike: mottled brown or black overall with a whitish-brown underbelly and thin, dirty-white fluff covering the head and neck. The base of the neck has a white collar, the eye is yellow or amber, the crop patch deep brown. The head does not have feathers. This is an adaptation that occurred because of the Rüppell vulture's tendency to stick its head inside of its prey when eating. Without the adaptation, feeding would become extremely messy. Silent as a rule, they become vocal at their nest and when at a carcass, squealing a great deal. The birds have a specialized variant of the hemoglobin alphaD subunit; this protein has a great affinity for oxygen, which allows the species to absorb oxygen efficiently despite the low partial pressure in the upper troposphere. A Rüppell's vulture was confirmed to have been ingested by a jet engine of an airplane flying over Abidjan, Ivory Coast on 29 November 1973 at an altitude of 11,300 m (37,000 ft).

Behavior and ecology 

Feeding 

Strictly a carrion feeder, the Rüppell's vulture has been known to follow game herds on their seasonal migrations and feeds in large numbers at carcasses, usually with other Old World vulture species. Though it might take advantage of the remains of an animal killed by a lion, or other large predator, it can also feed on animals that have died from injuries, disease, or old age. Though they prefer freshly-killed meat, they can eat older carcasses without a problem. Rüppell's vultures have several adaptations to their diet and are specialized feeders even among the Old World vultures of Africa. They have an especially powerful build and, after the most attractive soft parts of a carcass have been consumed, they will continue with the hide, and even the bones, gorging themselves until they can barely fly. They have backward-pointing spikes on the tongue to help remove meat from bone. Despite their size, power and adaptations, they are not the most dominant vulture in their range, which is considered to be the even larger lappet-faced vulture.

Reproduction 

This species of vulture is considered to be monogamous, forming lifelong breeding pairs. After courtship the pair will work together to build a nest using sticks, grass, and leaves that they have gathered or stolen from other nests. Rüppell's vultures build these nests on cliffs, and in key breeding areas they are known to nest in large colonies containing hundreds of breeding pairs. Both parents share in incubation of their egg over a period of 55 days. Once the chick hatches, both parents will feed and tend to it for about 150 days when it fledges. Young remain dependent on their parents after fledging, not reaching independence until the next breeding season.  During this time they learn how to find and compete for food.

Conservation
Since first being assessed by the International Union for Conservation of Nature in 1988, populations of Rüppell's vulture have decreased. The species has been listed with an IUCN Red List status of "near threatened" since 2007, and populations are estimated to decline. From 2012 to 2014 the Rüppell's vulture was listed as Endangered; however, it was reassessed in 2015 as Critically Endangered.

Rüppell's vulture is currently listed as an Appendix II species under CITES, which regulates the international trade of animals and plants. Under this designation, the Rüppell's vulture is defined as not being immediately at risk of extinction, although the current population could become threatened without a careful regulation of trade.

The total population of Rüppell's vulture has been estimated to be somewhere around 22,000 individuals, with specific populations in the following areas: Tanzania (3,000 pairs); Kenya (2,000 pairs); Ethiopia (2,000 pairs); Sudan (2,000 pairs); and West Africa (2,000 pairs).

Since 1992, Rüppell's vulture has been occurring as a vagrant in Spain and Portugal, with annual records since 1997, mainly in the Cádiz and Strait of Gibraltar area, but also further north.

Threats 
Rüppell's vulture populations are experiencing declining populations throughout their entire range. These declines can be attributed to loss of habitat related to human-related land use, poisoning, human use for medicine or meat, loss of nesting sites, and declining availability of food sources. Poisoning is currently thought to be the most serious threat to all vulture populations in Africa, although they are not usually the intended target. In events where predators such as lions or hyenas have killed livestock, carbofuran poisons have been placed into carcasses as retaliation against the predators. Vultures utilize carrion as their main food source, and one carcass has the potential to attract hundreds of birds to feed because this species identifies food by sight. One evaluation of 10 poisoning events found that each event caused the death of 37 to 600 individuals.

Killing of Rüppell's vultures for use in medicine has also greatly contributed to the rapid population decline. In many African cultures, vultures are used for medicine and magic related to superstitions that they are clairvoyant and can be used to increase a child's intelligence. Establishing protected wildlife areas is thought to be an effective route to protect the Rüppell's vulture from extinction. The Rüppell's vulture breed and nests in cliffs in northern and southern Kenya, as well as Tanzania. These breeding and nesting grounds amass huge numbers of Rüppell's vultures which will raise young and forage in the surrounding area. Considering that the detection rate of Rüppell's vultures was found to be lower in protected areas than outside of them, extending protection to these key breeding sites could help support their population.

See also 
 The white-backed vulture, which is slightly smaller and has a shorter neck.

References

External links 

Rüppell's vulture
Rüppell's vulture
Birds of prey of Sub-Saharan Africa
Birds of the Sahel
Birds of East Africa
Critically endangered fauna of Africa
Rüppell's vulture

Taxa named by Alfred Brehm